RV Moana Wave (AGOR-22), (former USNS Moana Wave (AGOR-22)), is the second ship of the  oceanographic research ship built in 1973.

Construction and commissioning 
The ship was laid down on 10 October 1972 and launched on 18 June 1973 by Halter Marine Corporation, New Orleans, Louisiana. Later acquired by the United States Navy on 6 January 1974 and later leased to the Hawaii Institute of Geophysics of the University of Hawaiʻi.

In February 1974, Moana Wave replaced the aging  after joining  at their homeport at the Marine Expeditionary Center at Pier 18 in Honolulu Harbor. In 1977, the ship operated for six years out of Fort Lauderdale and Little Creek after reaching an agreement with Naval Electronics System Command. The agreement included the testing of Moana Wave with the newly developed Navy's Surveillance Towed Array Sensor System (SURTASS).

Moana Wave then underwent overhaul and refit which added a 9-m section towards her amidships in 1984. Returned to Honolulu later in September of that same year. The start of the Hawaii Ocean Time-series (HOT) project extended the ship's time at sea with its inaugural cruise in October 1988.

At 08:00 on 28 May 1999, Moana Wave departed Honolulu for her last voyage. In the early morning of 30 May, the lei-draped ship lowered her flag for the last time outside the university's Marine Center. She was later sold to Ahtna Inc. and overhauled again to be used in the underwater mapping and fiber optic cable industries.

In 2011, the University of São Paulo bought the ship and renamed as N/Oc Alpha Crucis. She is named after the star, Alphacrucis in the Crux constellation. Alpha Crucis was acquired through the Multiuser Equipment Program (EMU), one of the modalities of the Research Infrastructure Support Program in the State of São Paulo, maintained by FAPESP since 1995.

References

Gyre-class oceanographic research ships
Ships built in New Orleans
1973 ships
University of Hawaiʻi